Denise Claire Gottfredson (née Denise Claire Ruff) is an American criminologist and professor in the Department of Criminal Justice and Criminology at the University of Maryland, College Park.

She is an expert on school violence and juvenile delinquency. She is recognized for her research applying the techniques of program evaluation to certain crime prevention initiatives, such as Drug Abuse Resistance Education, the Strengthening Families Program, and the Baltimore City Drug Treatment Court. She has also researched the effects of school resource officers on schools, finding that such officers spend an average of about half of their time engaged in law enforcement activities. She served as vice president of the American Society of Criminology (ASC) from 2005 to 2006, and as editor-in-chief of its journal, Criminology, from 2005 to 2011. She received the ASC's August Vollmer Award in 2016. She is a fellow of the ASC and of the Academy of Experimental Criminology.

Education and academic career
Gottfredson earned her B.A. in psychology from Fairleigh Dickinson University in 1974 and her Ph.D. in social relations from Johns Hopkins University in 1980. She became an assistant professor at the University of Maryland, College Park's Department of Criminal Justice and Criminology in 1986, and was promoted to full professor there in 1995.

References

Further reading

External links
Faculty page

Living people
American criminologists
American women criminologists
University of Maryland, College Park faculty
Academic journal editors
American women social scientists
Fairleigh Dickinson University alumni
Johns Hopkins University alumni
Year of birth missing (living people)
21st-century American women